Ronald Howard "Ron" Whitney  (born October 5, 1942) is a retired American hurdler and sprinter.  Known for his fast finish, he was sixth in the 400 m hurdles at the 1968 Summer Olympics.  He had entered the race as one of the favorites, having been ranked #1 in the world in 1967  and winning the USA Outdoor Track and Field Championships in the event for the second time earlier that year. At the Olympics, his first heat victory established a new Olympic record, only to be surpassed by David Hemery two days later.

Previously he had been the Pan American Games champion in the same event.  While working on his master's degree at Colorado State University, he was the 1967 Gold Medalist at the World University Games.  He also had won bronze two years earlier and while competing for Occidental College, where he was coached by Jim Bush, was runner up at the NCAA Championships in 1963.

At Thomas Downey High School in Modesto, California, Whitney was the champion at the 1960 Golden West Invitational, the equivalent of a national champion, at 800 m, a week after finishing fourth in the CIF California State Meet in the same event.

Whitney continued to compete into masters age groups as a pioneer of masters athletics.

Whitney continues to be involved in the sport as head track and field coach at Santa Rosa Junior College.  He is a member of the Mt. SAC Relays Hall of Fame and the Occidental College Hall of Fame.

References

1942 births
Living people
American male hurdlers
World record setters in athletics (track and field)
Athletes (track and field) at the 1967 Pan American Games
Athletes (track and field) at the 1968 Summer Olympics
Olympic track and field athletes of the United States
Pan American Games gold medalists for the United States
Sportspeople from Modesto, California
Sportspeople from Santa Rosa, California
Occidental College alumni
Track and field athletes from California
Pan American Games medalists in athletics (track and field)
Universiade medalists in athletics (track and field)
American masters athletes
Universiade gold medalists for the United States
Universiade bronze medalists for the United States
Medalists at the 1965 Summer Universiade
Medalists at the 1967 Summer Universiade
Medalists at the 1967 Pan American Games